Konary  is a village in the administrative district of Gmina Miejska Górka, within Rawicz County, Greater Poland Voivodeship, in west-central Poland.

The village has a population of 1,100.

References

Konary